The 1987-88 French Rugby Union Championship was won by Agen  that beat Stadoceste (Tarbes) in the final.

Formula 

 The tournament was played by 80 clubs divided in sixteen pools of five. .
 The two better of each pool (a sum of 32 clubs) were admitted to the group A to play for the title
 In the second round the 32 clubs of group A were divided in four pools of eight.
 The four better of each pool of group A (16 clubs) were qualified to play the knockout stage

Group A Qualification to knockout stage 

The teams are listed as the ranking, in bold the teams admitted  to "last 16" round.

Knockout stages

"Last 16" 
In bold the clubs qualified for the next round

Quarter of finals 
In bold the clubs qualified for the next round

Semifinals

Final

External links
 Compte rendu finale 1988 lnr.fr

1988
France
Championship